Crambidia is a genus of moths in the family Erebidae. The genus was described by Packard in 1864.

Species
Crambidia casta (Packard, 1869)
Crambidia cephalica (Grote & Robinson, 1870)
Crambidia cinnica Schaus, 1924
Crambidia dusca Barnes & McDunnough, 1913
Crambidia impura Barnes & McDunnough, 1913
Crambidia lithosioides Dyar, 1898
Crambidia myrlosea Dyar, 1917
Crambidia pallida Packard, 1864
Crambidia pura Barnes & McDunnough, 1913
Crambidia roberto Dyar, 1907
Crambidia scoteola Hampson, 1900
Crambidia suffusa Barnes & McDunnough, 1912
Crambidia uniformis Dyar, 1898

References

External links

Lithosiina
Moth genera